Salvatore Frega (born 1989) is an Italian composer of contemporary cultured music and experimental music, Director of the Versilia Music Academy and of TG Music and Professor at the Conservatory of Cosenza.

Career
Salvatore Frega was born of Arbëreshë parents of Firmo and, thanks to the intuition of his parents, he approaches piano at the tender age of four.

In 2012, he graduated in Piano at the San Giacomantonio Conservatory of Cosenza with Grazia Amato. Student of Andrea Portera at the Music School of Fiesole and of Ivan Fedele at the Accademia Nazionale di Santa Cecilia of Rome, he graduated in Composition in 2019 and again in 2019 in the High Specialization. Among its teachers, Salvatore Sciarrino and Giacomo Manzoni stand out.

His music is performed in various parts of the world: China, United States, Hungary, Russia, Turkey, Kazakhstan.

Professional collaborations
Salvatore Frega has had commissions and exhibitions such as: Venice Biennale, Koper Biennale, Sanremo Symphony Orchestra, Galilei Orchestra of the Fiesole Music School, Musical Afternoon Orchestra of Milan, Orchestra of the San Giacomantonio Conservatory of Cosenza, Fiorentina Chamber Orchestra, Budapest Symphony Orchestra MÁV, Pazardzhik Symphony Orchestra, The Kazakh Soloists, Eskisehir Philharmonic Orchestra, Art Center of Singapore, Qazaq Concert, Haydn Symphony Orchestra, Torre del Lago Puccini Symphony Orchestra.

8/9 Agosto 2021 - 67° Festival Puccini at Torre del Lago; with a commission for Ensemble and Voice Reciting with the theme of "Kiss at the time of COVID-19".

1 September 2021 - receives the commission for a world premiere ballet from the Fondazione Ente Luglio Musicale Trapanese.

2022/2023 - Composer in residence of the Puccini Festival of Torre del Lago.

22 dicember 2022 - Salvatore Frega, the only living composer to enter the Italian Senate with his music, receiving a commission from the Italian Senate to pay homage to Mogol, which premiered at the XXV Christmas Concert in the Italian Senate, live on Rai 1. The orchestra was directed by Maestro Beatrice Venezi.

His works have also been broadcast by Kazakh TV, the first national satellite television channel of the Khabar Agency and his scores are published by the Berlin music publisher Ries & Erler and are currently published by Edizioni Curci-Milan.

His music is distributed under ADA by Warner Music.

In 2019, the music critic Renzo Cresti, author of the book “Musica Presente - Tendenze e Compositori di oggi”, dedicated a few pages to Salvatore Frega.

Awards
 April 2012 - Winning Finalist of the III ° International Biennial of Contemporary Music in Koper (Slovenia)
 September 2018 - Winner of the silver medal at the Global Music Awards in Los Angeles with his work "unAnimes"

Honors

November 21, 2018 - Solemn commendation for his career, conferred on him by the Municipality of Firmo and the Calabria Region, Italy.

Published works
 Frega, Salvatore (2012). "Small Hops". Rovato: Edizioni Sconfinarte.
 Frega, Salvatore (2013). "Cercle magique": per flauto, clarinetto, tromba, pianoforte, violino e violoncello / Salvatore Frega. Rovato: Edizioni Sconfinarte.
 Frega, Salvatore (2013). "Vento d'oriente: per clarinetto e pianoforte". Rovato: Edizioni Sconfinarte.
 Frega, Salvatore (2017). "unAnimes". Rovato: Edizioni Sconfinarte.
 Frega, Salvatore (2018). "Magic Horse". Berlin: Ries & Erler.
 Frega, Salvatore (2019). "A ladies' man": for orchestra
 Frega, Salvatore (2019). "venti9". Mannheim: Edition Impronta.

Discography 
 Frega, Salvatore (2015). Eco meridionale. Pompei:  Falaut collection.
 Frega, Salvatore (2021). Sweep in Sunrise, Italian Music for Electric Guitar, London: RMN Music

Footnotes

References

External links

 Official Website

Arbëreshë people
Italian classical pianists
Male classical pianists
Italian male pianists
Living people
Italian classical composers
Italian male classical composers
People from the Province of Cosenza
20th-century classical composers
20th-century classical pianists
21st-century classical composers
21st-century classical pianists
21st-century Italian people
20th-century Italian composers
20th-century Italian male musicians
21st-century Italian male musicians
1989 births